Richmond Herald of Arms in Ordinary is an officer of arms of the College of Arms in England. From 1421 to 1485, Richmond was a herald to John, Duke of Bedford, George, Duke of Clarence, and Henry, Earl of Richmond, all of whom held the Honour (estate) of Richmond.  However, on the accession of Henry as Henry VII of England in 1485, Richmond became a king of arms and remained so until 1510, when the office became that of a herald in ordinary of the Crown.  The badge of office is a red rose of Lancaster dimidiating the white rose en soleil of York, ensigned by the royal crown. Although this device has all the characteristics of a Tudor invention, it is likely to be of fairly recent derivation. 

The current Richmond Herald of Arms in Ordinary is Clive Cheesman.

Holders of the office

See also
 Heraldry
 Officer of Arms
 The College of Arms

References
Citations

Bibliography
 The College of Arms, Queen Victoria Street : being the sixteenth and final monograph of the London Survey Committee, Walter H. Godfrey, assisted by Sir Anthony Wagner, with a complete list of the officers of arms, prepared by H. Stanford London, (London, 1963)
 A History of the College of Arms &c, Mark Noble, (London, 1804)

External links
Richmond Herald of Arms

Offices of the College of Arms